I Want My Man is a 1925 American drama film directed by Lambert Hillyer and written by Joseph F. Poland, Earle Snell, and Earl Hudson. It is based on the 1924 novel The Interpreter's House by Maxwell Struthers Burt. The film stars Doris Kenyon, Milton Sills, Phyllis Haver, May Allison, Kate Bruce, and Paul Nicholson. The film was released on March 22, 1925, by First National Pictures.

Plot
As described in a film magazine review, Gulian Eyre, a victim of World War I, is deserted by his nurse-wife just as he is to recover his sight. She goes to New York to fight for him against Lael Satori, the girl to whom he was engaged. Vida becomes companion to his mother. Lael insists on becoming engaged again to Gulian for his money and social position. Gulian’s brother, Philip, having involved hopelessly the fortune of Eyre & Co., brokers, commits suicide and Gulian is forced into the business world against his inclinations, shorn of his fortune. Lael breaks her engagement and he soon marries Vida, his mother’s companion. His fingers, made sensitive through eight years of blindness, recognize her as the nurse he married in France.

Cast

References

External links

Lobby card at gettyimages.com

1925 films
American drama films
1925 drama films
First National Pictures films
Films directed by Lambert Hillyer
American silent feature films
American black-and-white films
Films based on American novels
Films with screenplays by Joseph F. Poland
1920s English-language films
1920s American films
Silent American drama films